

General Information 
The South River is a  tributary of the Ocmulgee River in the U.S. state of Georgia. It originates in the city of East Point in Fulton County and eventually flows into Lake Jackson, joining the Yellow River and Alcovy River to form the Ocmulgee.

The present name "South River" is derived from shortening and alteration of the original name South Branch Ocmulgee River.

In 2021, non-profit American Rivers named the South River the 4th most endangered river in the United States, citing "the egregious threat that ongoing sewage pollution poses to clean water and public health."

River Flow and Course 
The river daylights just North of Hartsfield–Jackson Atlanta International Airport, in the city of East Point, Georgia. It proceeds to flow in a Southeasterly direction, through the suburbs of Atlanta, eventually flowing into Jackson Lake. The most notable rapid on the river is Snapping Shoals, located on the county line between Henry County and Newton County. The shoal is classified as a Class III. The dam immediately before Snapping Shoals was previously used as a hydro-electric production facility used to power a local machine shop.

See also
List of rivers of Georgia

References 

USGS Hydrologic Unit Map - State of Georgia (1974)

Rivers of Georgia (U.S. state)
Rivers of Fulton County, Georgia
Rivers of DeKalb County, Georgia
Rivers of Butts County, Georgia
Rivers of Newton County, Georgia
Rivers of Henry County, Georgia
Rivers of Rockdale County, Georgia